The Purkinje fibers (often incorrectly  ; Purkinje tissue or subendocardial branches) are located in the inner ventricular walls of the heart, just beneath the endocardium in a space called the subendocardium. The Purkinje fibers are specialized conducting fibers composed of electrically excitable cells. They are larger than cardiomyocytes with fewer myofibrils and many mitochondria. They conduct cardiac action potentials more quickly and efficiently than any of the other cells in the heart's electrical conduction system. Purkinje fibers allow the heart's conduction system to create synchronized contractions of its ventricles, and are essential for maintaining a consistent heart rhythm.

Histology

Purkinje fibers are a unique cardiac end-organ. Further histologic examination reveals that these fibers are split in ventricles walls. The electrical origin of atrial Purkinje fibers arrives from the sinoatrial node.

Given no aberrant channels, the Purkinje fibers are distinctly shielded from each other by collagen or the cardiac skeleton.

The Purkinje fibers are further specialized to rapidly conduct impulses (having numerous fast voltage-gated sodium channels  and mitochondria, and fewer myofibrils, than the surrounding muscle tissue). Purkinje fibers take up stain differently from the surrounding muscle cells because of having relatively fewer myofibrils than other cardiac cells.  The presence of glycogen around the nucleus causes Purkinje fibers to appear, on a slide, lighter and larger than their neighbors, being arranged along the longitudinal direction (parallel to the cardiac vector). They are often binucleated cells.

Function
Heart rate is governed by many influences from the autonomic nervous system. The Purkinje fibers do not have any known role in setting heart rate unless the SA node is compromised (when they can act as pacemaker cells). They are influenced by electrical discharge from the sinoatrial node.

Impulse carrying 
During the ventricular contraction portion of the cardiac cycle, the Purkinje fibers carry the contraction impulse from both the left and right bundle branch to the myocardium of the ventricles. This causes the muscle tissue of the ventricles to contract. This generates force to eject blood out of the heart, either to the pulmonary circulation from the right ventricle, or to the systemic circulation from the left ventricle.

Replacement pacemaker 
Purkinje fibers also have the ability of firing at a rate of 20–40 beats per minute if upstream conduction or pacemaking ability is compromised. In contrast, the SA node in normal state can fire at 60-100 beats per minute. In short, they generate action potentials, but at a slower rate than the sinoatrial node. This capability is normally suppressed. Thus, they serve as the last resort when other pacemakers fail. When a Purkinje fiber does fire, it is called a premature ventricular contraction or PVC, or in other situations can be a ventricular escape.

Etymology
Purkinje fibers are named after the Czech scientist Jan Evangelista Purkyně, who discovered them in 1839.

References

External links 
  - "Mammal heart, purkinje fibers (LM, Medium)"
 
 
Human Cardiac Muscle, histology slides at UC San Diego
Cardiac Muscle Tissue with Purkinje Fibers, Lonestar College North Harris Biology

Cardiac anatomy
Cardiac electrophysiology